Mr Wrong is a 1985 New Zealand horror film, directed by Gaylene Preston.
The film was based on an Elizabeth Jane Howard short story.

Synopsis
Meg buys a Jaguar, the previous owner had been murdered and the car is haunted.

Cast

Production
It was the first film made by Preston-Laing Productions (Gaylene Preston and Robin Laing).

Awards
 1986 National Mutual GOFTA Awards (New Zealand)
Best Female Performance in a Leading Role - Film: Heather Bolton

Nominated for Best Film Score: Jonathan Crayford 
 1986 Créteil International Women's Film Festival (France)
Most Popular Film.

References

External links

1985 films
1980s New Zealand films
1980s English-language films
Films set in New Zealand
Films shot in New Zealand
New Zealand horror films